Moroccan pop or abbreviated as Morocco-pop music is a genre of the new Moroccan music generation along the hip hop, rap music in Morocco.

List of Moroccan singers 
Manal
Asma Lamnawar
Saad Lamjarred
Salma Rachid 
Ibtissam Tiskat 
Ahmed Chawki

See also 
 Moroccan hip hop
 Moroccan Chaabi
 Gnawa
 Raï

References

External links 
 Le Pop Marocain in Bladi.net

Arab culture
Moroccan music
Moroccan styles of music
Moroccan hip hop
Pop music by country